Medhat al-Mahmoud (born September 21, 1933) is the former head of the Iraqi Supreme Judicial Council and is the 1st Chief Justice of Iraq. He has served in this capacity since 2005 to 2017.

Early career
Mahmoud was born and grew up in Rusafa, attending both primary and high school in Baghdad, before attending the College of Law at Baghdad University, which he graduated from as part of the class of 1959 as top of his class. After being admitted to the bar, he practiced law and also served as a reserve officer in the Iraqi Army. In 1960 he was appointed as a Judicial Investigator for the Department of Justice, and was later appointed as a Judge in 1968 after passing a competency examination. As a judge he served in numerous places in central Iraq, including Ar Rifa`i, Qalat Sukur, Musayyib, the Juvenile Court in Baghdad, as well as the Courts of First Instance in Kadhimiya and Baghdad.

Post-invasion career
Following the 2003 invasion of Iraq al-Mahmoud was made a supervisor, or minister, for the Ministry of Justice by the Coalition Provisional Authority on 12 June 2003. He was later appointed Vice President of the Court of Cassation, before being appointed as Chairman of the Federal Court of Cassation. On 3 March 2005 he was appointed as Chairman of the Federal Supreme Court as well as head of the Supreme Judicial Council, a body responsible for the oversight of all courts across Iraq.

He was removed from his position as Head of the Supreme Judicial Council in February 2013 following the passing of a new law preventing the Head of the Council from also being the Chairman of the Federal Supreme Court.

Attempted dismissal
In mid February 2013 Iraq's Justice and Accountability Committee decided to remove al-Mahmoud from his role as Chairman of Iraq's Supreme Federal Court. Mahmoud then filed a successful appeal to the cassation panel, which failed to find any strong evidence of ties to the previous regime, and rejected al-Mahmoud's dismissal.

References

1933 births
20th-century Iraqi lawyers
Living people
People from Baghdad
University of Baghdad alumni
21st-century Iraqi lawyers